Lake Patarcocha is a lake in Peru located in the Huánuco Region, Lauricocha Province, Cauri District at a height of about 4,130 m. It lies in the north-east of Raura mountain range, north-west of lakes Tinquicocha and Chuspi. Lake Patarcocha is 2.75 km long and 1 km at its widest point.

See also
 Puyhuanccocha
 Lake Huascacocha
List of lakes in Peru

References

Lakes of Peru
Lakes of Huánuco Region